The 2014–15 season will be Al-Minaa's 39th season in the Iraqi Premier League, having featured in all 41 editions of the competition except two.

Squad

Transfers

In

Out
{| class="wikitable"
|-
! Date
! Pos.
! Name
! To
! Fee
|-
| August 2014
| DF
|  Ahmed Sadeq
|  Al-Shula
| –
|-

| August 2014
| DF
|  Anas Jassim
|  Naft Al-Janoob
| –
|-
| August 2014
| DF
|  Jassim Faisal
|  Naft Al-Janoob
| –
|-
| August 2014
| DF
|  Safaa Hussein
|  Naft Maysan
| –
|-
| August 2014
| MF
|  Nayef Falah
|  Naft Maysan
| –
|-
| August 2014
| MF
|  Hassan Hamoud
|  Naft Maysan
| –
|-
| August 2014
| FW
|  Bassim Ali
|  Al Zawraa
| –
|-
| December 2014
| DF
|  Mohammed Jabbar Rubat
|  Al-Talaba
| –
|-

Technical staff

{| class="wikitable"
|-
! Position
! Name
|-
| Coach
|  Hussam Al Sayed
|-
|  Assistant coach
|  Ahmad Rahim
|-
| Fitness coach
|  Waleed Juma
|-
| Goalkeeping coach
|  Aqeel Abdul Mohsin
|-
| Club doctor
|  Faris Abdullah
|-
| Doctor's assistant
|  Fuad Mahdi

Board members

Stadium
During the previous season, the stadium of Al-Mina'a demolished. A company will build a new stadium that will be completed in 2015. Since they can't play their games at Al Mina'a Stadium, they will be playing at Az-Zubair Olympic Stadium during this season.

Matches

Pre-season friendlies

Mid-season friendlies

Iraqi Premier League

Group stage : Group – 2

Results by matchday

Matches
 Away matches

 Home matches

Summary table

Final Stage

Results by matchday

Matches
 Away matches

 Home matches

Summary table

Championship play-off
The group runners-up will play-off for third and fourth place.

Third place match

Top scorers

Sources
 Iraqi League 2014/2015
 Al-Minaa SC: Transfers and News
 Iraqia Sport TV

Al-Mina'a SC seasons
Al Mina